Maynards was a British confectionery manufacturer best known for manufacturing wine gums. It was acquired by Cadbury in the 1990s, which in turn was acquired by  Mondelez International (originally Kraft Foods) in 2010. In 2016, the brand was joined with Bassett's to create Maynards Bassetts.

History 
Charles Riley Maynard and his brother Tom started manufacturing sweets in 1880 in their kitchen in Stamford Hill in Hackney, London, England. Next door, Charles's wife, Sarah Ann, ran a sweet shop selling their products. In 1896 the brothers formed the Maynards sweet company. 

Ten years later, in 1906, the expanding concern moved a mile or so to a new factory in Vale Road, Harringay. The new factory site, below an embankment of the New River, permitted clean Hertfordshire spring water to be used in production, whilst the proximity of the Lee Navigation and numerous railways facilitated the easy, cheap shipping of the required coal, sugar, and gelatin. London itself provided a ready market of some ten million people, and the world's largest commercial port was within five miles.

Around the turn of the century, Charles Gordon, heir to the confectionery firm, suggested to his father that they diversify into making "wine gums", an idea that outraged Charles senior, a strictly teetotal Methodist. Nevertheless, Charles Riley gradually came round to the idea when his son persuaded him that the projected new sweets would not contain alcohol. Maynards Wine Gums were introduced in 1909.

The works grew consistently to become a four-figure employer in the Harringay area. As Maynards grew, it expanded its manufacturing operations to other locations. These included a toffee factory in Ouseburn, Newcastle.

The brothers' roots in sweet shop retailing were instrumental in the growth of retail operations to 140 shops. These were disposed of by sale in 1985.

In 1990, Maynards merged with the Tottenham liquorice mill Bassett's, and Trebor. In 1988, following the acquisition of the company by Cadbury, the London factory closed and Maynards Wine Gums and associated sweet manufacture was continued at a Sheffield premises that had come on-stream in 1991. By 2002 worldwide sales of Maynards Wine Gums were forty million pounds sterling per annum.

The Harringay premises is now a warehouse for The Oriental Carpet Company. The Ouseburn toffee factory is part of a multimillion-pound urban regeneration programme.

Charles Riley Maynard was the grandfather of engineer Kenneth Maynard Wood, co-founder of kitchen appliance company Kenwood Ltd, manufacturer of the Kenwood Chef food mixer.

Products 
Excluding items that are licensed by Unilever and/or Nestle, such as Sour Patch Kids bar.

 Maynards Wine Gums
 Maynards Wine Pastilles
 Maynards Wine Sours 
 Maynards Sports Mixture
 Maynards Midget Gems 
 Maynards Wine Gums Light
 Maynards Swedish Berries
 Maynards Fuzzy Peaches
 Maynards Swedish Fish
 Maynards Sour Cherry Blasters
 Maynards Sour Watermelons
 Maynards Sour Patch Kids
 Maynards Ultra Sour Patch Kids
 Maynards Sour Patch Kids Soda Popz (UK only)

 Maynards Sour Chillers
 Maynards Juicy Squirts Berry
 Maynards Blush Berries
 Maynards Blackberry Bushels
 Maynards Orange Twists
 Maynards Sour Grapes
 Maynards Granny Smith
 Maynards Gummy Bears
 Maynards Fruit Mania

External links 
 Maynards Advert - Joose Loose aboot this Hoose!

Sources
 
 Former Cadbury UK Maynards information page (archived)

References 

Confectionery companies of the United Kingdom
Harringay
British companies established in 1896
Food and drink companies established in 1896
1896 establishments in England
Cadbury brands
Mondelez International brands